Buttermilk is an unincorporated community in Pope County, Arkansas, United States. The community's name was derived from an observer who saw the whitewash run off the Cumberland Presbyterian Church during a rain storm in 1840 and commented that it looked like buttermilk.

References

Unincorporated communities in Pope County, Arkansas
Unincorporated communities in Arkansas